The AFC second round of 2026 FIFA World Cup qualification, which also serves as the second round of 2027 AFC Asian Cup qualification, is expected to be played from 16 November 2023 to 11 June 2024.

Format
A total of thirty-six teams will be drawn into nine groups of four to play home-and-away round-robin matches. They include the twenty-five teams (teams ranked 1–25 in the AFC entrant list) which received byes to this round, and the eleven winners from the first round.

Eighteen group winners and runners-up advance to the third round and qualify for 2027 AFC Asian Cup. The third and fourth place teams will advance to the third round of the 2027 Asian Cup qualification.

Seeding
The draw for the second round will be held on July 2023 at 17:00 MST (UTC+8), at the AFC House in Kuala Lumpur, Malaysia.

Schedule
The schedule is expected to be as follows, according to the FIFA International Match Calendar.

Groups

Group A

Group B

Group C

Group D

Group E

Group F

Group G

Group H

Group I

References 

2
2023 in Asian football
2024 in Asian football
FIFA World Cup qualification, AFC Round 2
FIFA World Cup qualification, AFC Round 2